Hoshang Shah (Alp Khan) (1406–1435) was the first formally appointed Sultan of the Malwa Sultanate of Central India. Also called Hushang Shah Gori, he was known as Alp Khan before he took on the title Hoshang Shah after being crowned the ruler of Malwa. Alp Khan's father Dilawar Khan Ghori had belonged to the court of Firozshah Tughlaq, the Sultan of Delhi. Dilawar Khan Gori was appointed governor of Malwa probably by Firuz of the house of Tughlaq, but made himself independent of the Delhi Sultanate for all practical purposes in 1401. Thus he had practically come to Mandu in 1401 as the first King of Malwa, although he did not declare himself a king.

References 

Kings of Malwa
People from Hoshangabad
15th-century Indian monarchs